Farajabad (also Romanized as Farajābād; also known as Faraḩābād) is a village in Kelarestaq-e Sharqi Rural District, in the Central District of Chalus County, Mazandaran Province, Iran. At the 2006 census, its population was 706, in 204 families.

References 

Populated places in Chalus County